Moldovans in Romania include the people born in the Republic of Moldova living in Romania and their descendants. The largest group of immigrants in Romania are from Moldova. Owing to the former period of union between most of Moldova and Romania, many Moldovans are eligible for Romanian citizenship on the basis of Romanian descent. Many immigrants from the Republic of Moldova prefer to settle in the Romanian counties from the region of Western Moldavia as the culture there is more similar to that of their home country. There are also significant Moldovan communities in the largest cities of Romania, such as Bucharest (Wallachia) as well as Cluj-Napoca and Timișoara (both in Transylvania).

See also
Moldova–Romania relations
Moldovan diaspora

References

Romania
Romanian people of Moldovan descent
Ethnic groups in Romania